Red Army man was the lowest military rank in the Red Army of the Soviet Union from 1918 to 1946.

On 30 November 1917, after the October Revolution, the Military Revolutionary Committee cancelled all "officer and class ranks" in keeping with the egalitarian spirit of the revolution. Henceforth, the term Red Army man was used to refer to all ordinary soldiers.

Its naval equivalent was Red Fleet man.

Additional insignia

See also
 Ranks and insignia of the Red Army and Navy 1918–1935
 Ranks and insignia of the Red Army and Navy 1935–1940
 Ranks and insignia of the Red Army and Navy 1940–1943

References

Citations

Bibliography 
 
Military ranks of the Soviet Union